A tree chipper or woodchipper is a machine used for reducing wood (generally tree limbs or trunks) into smaller woodchips. They are often portable, being mounted on wheels on frames suitable for towing behind a truck or van. There are also high power chipper models mounted on trucks and powered by a separate engine. These models usually also have a hydraulic winch.

Tree chippers are typically made of a hopper with a collar, the chipper mechanism itself, and an optional collection bin for the chips. A tree limb is inserted into the hopper (the collar serving as a partial safety mechanism to keep human body parts away from the chipping blades) and started into the chipping mechanism. The chips exit through a chute and can be directed into a truck-mounted container or onto the ground. The resulting wood chips have various uses such as being spread as a ground cover or being fed into a digester during papermaking.

Most woodchippers rely on energy stored in a heavy flywheel to do their work (although some use drums). The chipping blades are mounted on the face of the flywheel, and the flywheel is accelerated by an electric motor or internal combustion engine.

Large woodchoppers are frequently equipped with grooved rollers in the throat of their feed funnels. Once a branch has been gripped by the rollers, the rollers transport the branch to the chipping blades at a steady rate. These rollers are a safety feature and are generally reversible for situations where a branch gets caught on clothing.

History
The woodchipper was invented by Peter Jensen (Maasbüll, Germany) in 1884, the "Marke Angeln"  soon became the core business of his company, which already produced and repaired communal- and woodworking-machinery.

Types

Disc

The original chipper design employs a steel disk with blades mounted upon it as the chipping mechanism. This technology dates back to an invention by German Heinrich Wigger, for which he obtained a patent in 1922.  In this design, (usually) reversible hydraulically powered wheels draw the material from the hopper towards the disk, which is mounted perpendicularly to the incoming material. As the disk is turned by a motor, the blades mounted on the face of the disk cut the material into chips. These are thrown out the chute by flanges on the edges of the disk.

One application of industrial disk chippers is to produce the wood chips used in the manufacture of particle board.

Drum

Drum chippers employ mechanisms consisting of a large steel drum powered by a motor. The drum is mounted parallel to the hopper and spins toward the chute. Blades mounted to the outer surface of the drum cut the material into chips and propel the chips into the discharge chute.

Conventionally-fed drum chippers use the drum as the feed mechanism, drawing the material through as it chips it. These are colloquially known as "chuck-and-duck" chippers, due to the immediate speed attained by material dropped into the drum. Chippers of this type have many drawbacks and safety issues. If an operator becomes snagged on material being fed into the machine, injury or death is very likely. Hydraulically-fed drum chippers have largely replaced conventionally-fed machines. These chippers use a set of hydraulically powered wheels to regulate the rate of feed of material into the chipper drum.

Other
Much larger machines for wood processing exist. "Whole tree chippers" and "Recyclers", which can typically handle material diameters of  may employ drums, disks, or a combination of both. Most are so heavy that they require a semi-trailer truck to be transported. Smaller models can be towed by a medium duty truck.

Blades
Although chippers vary greatly in size, type, and capacity, the blades processing the wood are similar in construction. Chipper blades are made from high grade steel and usually contain a minimum of 8% chromium for hardness.

City services
Fallen branches, especially when it is suspected that they are infested by beetles or their larva, are
chipped to prevent further infestation.
 City government acquires and operates chippers as needed,
including for seasonal use.

Safety
Thirty-one people were killed in woodchipper accidents between 1992 and 2002 in the US, according to a 2005 report by the Journal of the American Medical Association.

In popular culture
Joel and Ethan Coen's film Fargo features an infamous scene in which Peter Stormare, as Gaear Grimsrud, feeds the remains of Steve Buscemi's character, Carl Showalter, into a woodchipper.<ref>{{Cite web|url=https://ew.com/article/2016/03/08/fargo-20th-anniversary-wood-chipper-oral-history/|title='Fargos wood-chipper turns 20: A brief oral history|website=EW.com|language=en|access-date=2019-05-07}}</ref> The scene, according to the film's special edition DVD, was based on the 1986 murder of Helle Crafts. The woodchipper used in the scene is now a tourist attraction at the Fargo-Moorhead Visitors Center.

It was claimed that Saddam Hussein used chippers to murder dissident citizens of his country.

The 2023 horror film Winnie-the-Pooh: Blood and Honey'' contains a scene depicting the use of a woodchipper as a murder weapon.

See also

References

External links
brush chipper for biomass, Vermeer India
Chipper/Shredder Safety, Kansas State University

Agricultural machinery
Organic farming
Gardening tools
Woodworking machines
Forestry equipment